Zagorodny is a rural locality (a selo) in Otradovsky Selsoviet, Sterlitamaksky District, Bashkortostan, Russia. The population was 2,188 as of 2010. There are 30 streets.

Geography 
Zagorodny is located 7 km southwest of Sterlitamak (the district's administrative centre) by road. Novaya Otradovka is the nearest rural locality.

References 

Rural localities in Sterlitamaksky District